MZ Puppis is a red supergiant star in the constellation of Puppis.

References

Puppis
M-type supergiants
Puppis, MZ
Slow irregular variables